Helsing Junction is an unincorporated community in Thurston County, in the U.S. state of Washington. The community is located south of U.S. Route 12, near the Chehalis River, and east of the populated area of Chehalis Village, Washington.

History
A variant name is "Helsing". The name "Helsing" is a corruption of Helsingfors, meaning "Helsinki" in Swedish.

References

Unincorporated communities in Thurston County, Washington